Joe Wilson is a 1988 mini series about Joe Wilson, based on the stories by Henry Lawson. Jack Thompson began as director but left after two weeks.

References

External links
Joe Wilson at IMDb

1980s Australian television miniseries
1988 Australian television series debuts
1988 Australian television series endings
1988 television films
1988 films